Byars may refer to:

Byars (surname)
Byars, Oklahoma, town, United States